The LG Lancet is a low-end budget smartphone made by LG Electronics. It was first launched as a Windows Phone 8.1 device in July 2015 and was made available in an Android 5.1 version in October of that year. Both devices are available from Verizon Wireless.

Features 
The LG Lancet featured a 4.5-inch touchscreen display with a 854 x 480 pixel screen resolution. It was powered by a 1.2 GHz Qualcomm Snapdragon Quad-core Processor and ran on 2,100 mAh battery with 8 GB internal storage that could be expanded up to 128 GB. The device was criticized for the quality of photos taken by its 8-megapixel primary camera and a 0.3-megapixel front-facing camera.

Verizon sold the Lancet for $120 off-contract and $69.99 on-contract. It was part of the three Windows devices sold during the period with the other two being the high-end HTC One (M8) and the mid-range Lumia 735.

References

Windows Phone devices